Gabasongduo (Mandarin: 尕巴松多镇) is a town under the jurisdiction of Tongde County, Hainan Tibetan Autonomous Prefecture, Qinghai, China. In 2010, Gabasongduo had a total population of 27,742: 14,401 males and 13,341 females: 7,573 under 14 years old, 18,976 between the age of 15 and 65 and 1,193 over 65.

References 

Township-level divisions of Qinghai
Tongde County